Mary Adelaide may refer to:
Princess Mary Adelaide of Cambridge (1833–1897), later Duchess of Teck, by marriage
Princess Marie Adélaïde of France (1732–1800), daughter of Louis XV of France
Marie-Adélaïde, Grand Duchess of Luxembourg (1894–1924), Sovereign of Luxembourg
Princess Marie-Adélaïde of Savoy (1685–1712), mother of Louis XV of France